FC Nantes won Division 1 season 1964/1965 of the French Association Football League with 43 points.

Participating teams

 Angers SCO
 Bordeaux
 RC Lens
 Lille OSC
 Olympique Lyonnais
 AS Monaco
 FC Nantes
 Nîmes Olympique
 Stade Rennais UC
 FC Rouen
 AS Saint-Étienne
 UA Sedan-Torcy
 FC Sochaux-Montbéliard
 Stade Français FC
 RC Strasbourg
 SC Toulon
 Toulouse FC (1937)
 US Valenciennes-Anzin

Final table

Promoted from Division 2, who will play in 1965–66 French Division 1
 OGC Nice: Champion of Division 2
 Red Star Olympique: runner-up of Division 2
 AS Cannes: Third place

Results

Top goalscorers

References
 Division 1 season 1964-1965 at pari-et-gagne.com

Ligue 1 seasons
French
1